Christopher P. Mathias (born May 14, 1978) is an American politician and attorney serving as a member of the Idaho House of Representatives from the 19th district, which includes a portion of Boise, Idaho.

Early life and education 
Mathias enlisted in the United States Coast Guard after graduating from high school. During his service, Mathias engaged in search and rescue and law enforcement operations, and later conducted shipboard communications on the USCGC Polar Star, the nation's heaviest non-nuclear icebreaker.

He used the G.I. Bill to earn a Bachelor of Science in criminal justice administration from Boise State University, where he was student body president and the university's first McNair Scholar. Mathias later earned a Juris Doctor from Vermont Law School and a doctorate in law and public policy from Northeastern University. His dissertation focused on how Idaho has implemented the National Incident Management System.

Career 
Mathias worked as law clerk for U.S. Senator Patrick Leahy and later as a lecturer at Northeastern University. After completing his Ph.D., he worked as the chief academic officer for the Idaho State Board of Education and then for the University of California, Santa Cruz.

Mathias is the recipient of the Idaho Governor's Commendation for Distinguished Public Service and the Idaho Business Review's Accomplished 40 Under 40 award.

Personal life 
Mathias lives in the North End neighborhood of Boise, Idaho, with his wife Katie and their two children.

References 

1978 births
Living people
People from Boise, Idaho
Boise State University alumni
Vermont Law and Graduate School alumni
Northeastern University alumni
Democratic Party members of the Idaho House of Representatives
21st-century American politicians
United States Coast Guard non-commissioned officers